James Henderson was Archdeacon of Northumberland from 1905 to 1917.

Born into a  medical family  in Berwick-upon-Tweed in September 1840 Henderson was educated at University College, Durham and ordained in 1863. After  curacies in Newcastle  and Hurworth-on-Tees he held incumbencies in Ancroft, Shadforth and Wallsend before his Archdeacon’s appointment.

Henderson died on 21 April 1935

References

1840 births
People from Berwick-upon-Tweed
Alumni of University College, Durham
Archdeacons of Northumberland
1935 deaths